Ulla Werner Hansen (born 27 November 1973) is a Danish rower. She competed in the women's quadruple sculls event at the 1992 Summer Olympics.

References

1973 births
Living people
Danish female rowers
Olympic rowers of Denmark
Rowers at the 1992 Summer Olympics
Rowers at the 1996 Summer Olympics
Place of birth missing (living people)